The Universal Merchant Bank, formerly known as Merchant Bank Ghana Limited, is a Ghanaian bank headquartered in Accra.

Overview
The Universal Merchant Bank first opened to the public on 15 March 1972 as a merchant bank. The bank later introduced retail banking with the acquisition of a universal banking license in 2005.

Branch Network
The Universal Merchant Bank has its headquarters in Accra, the capital city of Ghana. The branches of the bank and its subsidiary companies include the following locations:
 Head office - SSNIT Emporium Building, Liberation Road, Airport City, Accra
 Abeka UMB Branch - Opsem House, opposite SSNIT Building 
 Abossey Okai Branch - adjacent to former Fan Milk depot 
 Achimota Branch - Mile 7 Junction just around the Goil Filling Station
 Adabraka  Branch - 123 Sethi Plaza, near Adabraka Police Station 
 Airport City Branch - Liberation Road, SSNIT Emporium Building, Airport City
 East Legon Branch -  near the East Legon Restaurant
 Junction Mall Branch - Junction Mall, Nungua 
 Kaneshie Branch - Fisherman House near Hansonic Junction
 Labone Branch - 9 Ndebaninge Road, opposite Labone Secondary School

References

Banks of Ghana